The 720s decade ran from January 1, 720, to December 31, 729.

Significant people
 Yazid II
 Hisham
 Leo III the Isaurian
 Pope Gregory II

References